Walter Richard "Crip" Schreiner (December 31, 1877 – April 6, 1933) was a college football player. He ran the Live Oak Ranch owned by his father for many years.  His father gave him the Y O Ranch which he ran until his death in 1933.  The Live Oak Ranch became part of the Y O.

Early years
Walter Schreiner was born on December 31, 1877, in Kerrville, Texas to Captain Charles Arman Schreiner and Mary Magdelena Enderle Schreiner. His father Charles was born in Alsace-Lorraine of German ancestry.

University of Texas
He was a prominent end for the Texas Longhorns football team of the University of Texas; the only athlete to win five football letters on the Texas varsity. He was chosen for an all-time Texas team by R. W. Franklin.

1899
He was selected All-Southern in 1899.

1900
Schreiner was captain of the undefeated 1900 team.

References

1877 births
1933 deaths
Texas Longhorns football players
American football ends
19th-century players of American football
All-Southern college football players
People from Kerrville, Texas
Players of American football from San Antonio
American people of German descent
People from Hunt County, Texas